Gears of War is a video game franchise that debuted on November 9, 2006 with Gears of War for the Xbox 360 and was a best-seller. The fictional universe of the series takes place on the fictional planet Sera and focus on a war between humans and creatures known as Locust. The franchise has since spawned several novels, art books, a series of comic books, and a board game by Fantasy Flight Games, with a film currently in pre-production.

Video games

Printed

Other media

Soundtracks

References 

Media
Gears of War media
Gears of War